Stephen Butcher may refer to:

Stephen Butcher (Royal Marine) (1904–2005), English serviceman; one of UK's last 11 veterans of World War I
Stephen Butcher (director) (born 1946), English television director of Eastenders
Stephen Butcher (Sudbury) (born 1953), Canadian politician
Stephen Butcher (footballer) (born 1994), English footballer

See also
Butcher (disambiguation)